Glyphis hastalis is a species of extinct river shark from Great Britain. Modern relatives include the Ganges shark and speartooth shark.

References

Glyphis (shark)
Fossil taxa described in 1843